The 144th Regiment Illinois Volunteer Infantry was an infantry regiment that served in the Union Army during the American Civil War.

Service
The 144th Illinois Infantry Regiment was organized at Alton, Illinois, and was mustered into Federal service on October 21, 1864, for a one-year enlistment. The regiment served in garrisons in the Saint Louis, Missouri, area and at the prisoner of war camp at Alton, Illinois. It never saw combat.

The regiment was mustered out of service 3 months early on July 14, 1865, because the war had ended.

Total strength and casualties
The regiment suffered 69 enlisted men who died of disease for a total of 69 fatalities.

Commanders
Colonel Cyrus Hall - resigned March 7, 1865.
Colonel John H. Kuhn -  mustered out with the regiment.

See also
List of Illinois Civil War Units
Illinois in the American Civil War

Notes

References
The Civil War Archive

Units and formations of the Union Army from Illinois
Military units and formations established in 1864
1864 establishments in Illinois
Military units and formations disestablished in 1865